Eva Llorach (born 1979) is a Spanish actress. She had a breakout performance in the 2018 drama film Quién te cantará, which earned her the Goya Award for Best New Actress in 2019.

Biography 
She was born in Murcia in 1979. She worked in the company owned by his father, specialised in machine industry. A lateblooming actress, she previously studied Tourism, and also dropped out in Psychology. She trained as an actress at the Escuela Superior de Arte Dramático de Murcia.

She worked in advertising as well as she was also given a minor role in the TV series Los Quién, aired in 2011 on Antena 3. Her first performance in a feature film after she moved to Madrid was her leading role as 'Violeta' in Diamond Flash, a 2011 film directed by Carlos Vermut.

During her early career, Eva Llorach was mostly restricted to the circuit of independent cinema, and was only given minor roles in television series. She starred in the film #Realmovie (2013), in which she played the character 'Eva Binoff', a famous Spanish actress who experiences the kidnapping of her sister and has to found her she is murdered. She played too the role of a fictional actress in La lava en los labios (2013).

Her breakout performance was her role in the 2018 film Quién te cantará. She played 'Violeta', a single mother psychologically abused by her daughter 'Marta' (Natalia de Molina) and who works in a karaoke and likes to perform singer 'Lila Cassen' (Najwa Nimri), of whom Violeta is a passionate fan. Her performance in the film brought her a Forqué Award, a Feroz Award and a Goya Award in 2019.

Following her performance in Quién te cantará, she joined the cast of Elite to portray 'Sandra', the mother of 'Rebeca' (Claudia Salas) in the series. Llorach also appeared in the limited web terror series Terror y Feria. She later starred in the TV series  Campamento Albanta, aired in 2020 on Atresplayer Premium: she played the role of Idalia, the founder of the camp for young people with problems central to the plot.

Filmography 

Television

Film

Accolades

References

External links
 

1979 births
21st-century Spanish actresses
Spanish film actresses
Spanish television actresses
Living people
Goya Award winners
Actors from the Region of Murcia